Nymph is the debut studio album by British rapper and singer Shygirl. It was released on 30 September 2022 on vinyl, CD, cassette and digital download, through Because Music. The album was announced alongside the release of its lead single "Firefly" on 10 May 2022. The second single "Come for Me" was released on 7 June 2022.

Composition
Nymph is primarily a pop album, through critics have noted that the album resists strict genre classification. "Firefly", "Heaven", and "Coochie (A Bedtime Story)" are all hyperpop songs with the latter incorporating trap beats. UK garage and 2-step are present on both "Firefly" and "Wildfire", while "Nike" and "Missing U" incorporate rap music. "Poison" is a Europop-inspired blog house track "with a raucous accordion hook and club-ready bass squelches". "Honey" merges jungle breakbeats and liquid drum 'n' bass into a "sultry" R&B ballad. The Arca-produced "Come for Me" is a "mutant" reggaetón song with "sparse, militant drum patterns sound like they’ve been swallowed by broken subwoofers"

Critical reception

Nymph was met with universal acclaim upon its release. At Metacritic, which assigns a normalised rating out of 100 to reviews from mainstream publications, the album received an average score of 84, based on 10 reviews.

Track listing 
Credits adapted from the album's official liner notes.

Notes

  signifies an additional producer
 "Come for Me" features additional vocals by Arca.
 "Shlut" features additional vocals by Cosha and Sega Bodega.
 "Firefly" features additional vocals by Cecile Believe.

Sample credits
 "Woe" contains a sample of "Bunny is a Rider", performed by Caroline Polachek, written by Polachek and Daniel Harle.
 "Firefly" contains samples of "Ready to Make Luv", performed by Trey Songz, written by Tremaine Aldon Neverson & Troy Taylor.

Charts

Nymph_o 

A deluxe edition/remix album, titled Nymph_o, was announced on 28 February 2023, and is slated for release on 14 April 2023. It will feature new songs, as well as remixes of the album's tracks.

It was preceded by the single releases of "Poison (Club Shy mix)", and a remix of "Heaven", featuring American singer Tinashe. Additionally, "Unconditional" was originally released in June 2020 exclusively on Bandcamp to raise funds for Black Lives Matter during the George Floyd protests.

Notes
  signifies an additional producer

References 

2022 debut albums
Albums produced by Arca (musician)
Albums produced by BloodPop
Albums produced by Danny L Harle
Albums produced by Mura Masa
Albums produced by Sega Bodega
Albums produced by Vegyn
Because Music albums
Shygirl albums